A Friend of Mine is a 2011 Estonian drama film directed by Mart Kivastik.

Cast
 Raivo Adlas as Head Doctor
 Aleksander Eelmaa as Sass
 Tõnu Oja as Doctor
 Rita Raave as Ruth
 Sulev Teppart as Psychiatrist
 Aarne Üksküla as Mati
 Merle Jääger as Mati's wife
 Harriet Toompere as Mari, Mati's daughter
 Ingmar-Erik Kiviloo as Karl, Mari's son
 Markus Luik as Tõnn
 Raivo Adlas as Doctor 
 Ursula Ratasepp as Nurse

References

External links
 
 Üks mu sõber, at Estonian Film Database

2011 films
2011 drama films
Estonian-language films
Estonian drama films